Troke is a surname. Notable people with the surname include:

 Helen Troke (born 1964), British badminton player
 Shaun Troke (born 1978), British director and actor
  (born 1960s), English badminton player